The Calgary Regents were a women's ice hockey team from Calgary, Alberta during the 1910s and 1920s.

The Calgary Regents won the Alpine Cup at the Banff Winter Carnival four times between 1917 and 1921, the last time after having defeated the Vancouver Amazons 4 goals to 1 on February 4 in 1921, after a hat-trick by righter winger Mabel Short.

See also
 Canadian women's ice hockey history

References

Notes

Women's ice hockey teams in Canada
Defunct ice hockey teams in Canada
Ice hockey teams in Calgary
Women in Alberta